The Comunidad Israelita de El Salvador is the communal name for the Jewish community of El Salvador. The community is centralized at the synagogue in San Salvador, which is not the only synagogue in El Salvador in fact it is the only conservative synagogue but there is several Orthodox synagogues.

History
The first synagogue was located in the city center in 1949. Currently, the community center is located in the San Benito, a very exclusive neighborhood of San Salvador.

See also
History of the Jews in El Salvador

Conservative Judaism in North America
Conservative synagogues
Synagogues in El Salvador